Helmas (also known as Helmës) is a village and a former rural municipality situated in the central plains of Albania's Western Lowlands region. It is part of Tirana County. At the 2015 local government reform it became a subdivision of the municipality Kavajë. The population at the 2011 census was 3,139.

References

Administrative units of Kavajë
Former municipalities in Tirana County
Villages in Tirana County